Bernardo O. Dagala (August 20, 1869  August 16, 1966) was a Filipino politician who served as the President of the Municipality of Malabon, from 1903 until 1905 when Malabon annexed its neighbor Navotas through Act No. 942.

References

People from Navotas
Mayors of Navotas
1869 births
1966 deaths